The Student is a fortnightly independent newspaper produced by students at the University of Edinburgh. It was founded in 1887 by Robert Louis Stevenson, making it the UK's oldest student newspaper. It held the title of Best Student Newspaper in Scotland, awarded by the Herald Student Press Awards in 2006, 2007, 2009 and 2010.

The newspaper has been independent of the university since 1992, but maintains a commercial agreement with the Edinburgh University Students' Association. Since September 2017, the paper has been produced on a fortnightly, rather than weekly, basis.

The newspaper is produced by volunteers, who fit this work around their studies. The newspaper is distributed on a Wednesday and usually consists of 32 pages. It has a physical circulation of 2,500 copies per issue and is read by some 30,000 people in Edinburgh.

History 

The Student was founded in 1887 by Robert Louis Stevenson. It started as a small weekly magazine, published by the Students' Representative Council. A typical, turn-of-the-century edition of The Student would open with a short biography of a notable person and an editorial. The remaining content largely comprised notes from various societies, sports results, poetry and literary reviews, and profiles of newly appointed lecturers. The magazine was supported by advertising, but cost two pence.

By the 1970s, The Student had become a weekly newspaper, roughly Berliner in format. The running of the newspaper was by this stage in the control of the Student Publications Board, a body independent of the university. It was during the first half of the 1970s that Gordon Brown was a news editor. The type of content had shifted to reflect the times: a typical copy would contain pages on news, the environment, society, features, politics and entertainment. By this point, the price had risen to five pence.

The 1990s saw the introduction of computers to the newspaper; the offices were also moved from the Student Publications Board offices at 1 Buccleuch Place to their present location in the Pleasance, anecdotally held to be space reclaimed after the closure of a monkey-testing lab. Initially, the newspaper was laid out on Apple Macintosh computers. During this period, Darius Danesh briefly wrote for the paper, as a film and music critic.

In 1992 Student, which had been selling for 20 pence, was dropped by the student union as part of a cost-cutting exercise. A grant of £5,000 from the University Development Fund allowed it to continue as a student society for a few years. By 1997 the newspaper was under severe financial pressure, selling only around a thousand copies a week at 20 pence each, the advertising was largely ineffective. During the course of the year the newspaper stopped publishing to avoid going into debt and a relaunch was scheduled for the start of the Autumn term with a shift towards a free distribution model. This shift resulted in a wholesale change in how the newspaper was produced. For the first time the newspaper was printed on a web offset press, full colour printing was available and the newspaper was fully produced on computers not old fashioned light boxes. The initial circulation after the relaunch was around 5,000 copies distributed through cardboard stands around the various university campuses. To ease the transition the newspaper was published on a fortnightly basis for a year. After a successful advertising funded first year the newspaper returned to being published weekly and within two years the circulation crept up to over 12,000 copies a week aided by initiatives such as a second edition catering to the other universities within Edinburgh and a seven-day TV guide.

The paper, now a tabloid in format, won the Herald Student Media Award for best newspaper in 1998, 2006, 2007, 2008 and 2010 and the Guardian Student Media Awards for 'Best Newspaper on a Shoestring' in 2001. The paper was redesigned several times in the lead-up to the millennium and winning the Herald Award for its design in 2004. After failing to win the same award the following year, the paper was again radically redesigned in 2006.

Many of The Students former writers have gone on to become internationally renowned journalists and politicians. Past staff members of Student include the former British Prime Minister Gordon Brown; Lord Steel; Robin Cook; and many of Fleet Street's reporters and editors. Recent graduates include Guardian staff writer and editor Helen Pidd and BBC radio reporter Chris Page.

 Notable pieces 

 'Page Three' feature 
In early 2005, The Student published an editorial discussing Page 3 and nudity in the media, accompanied by two full-page, semi-naked glamour model photographs: one male, one female. The newspaper received a complaint from the university's Islamic Society (ISocEd) as a result. The local newspaper Edinburgh Evening News published a story regarding the feature, which was subsequently picked up by several national newspapers. The photograph of the female model – who was wearing underwear and a scarf covering her nipples – was reprinted alongside each of these articles.

Newspapers claimed there had been "floods of complaints" and that the female model was in hiding. Furthermore, Catherine Harper of Scottish Women Against Pornography said that "[This] will lead students to only view women as a pair of breasts." However, The Sun defended the publication of a page similar to its own and even offered the model a place in its paper.

 "Pure" controversy 
In November 2006 The Student ran a series of front pages highlighting the Christian Union's "Pure" course which allegedly taught that homosexuality was a "curable condition." The main complaint of The Student was that the course was being taught at the Chaplaincy Centre, which is a university building. This raised concerns in regards to the university's anti-discrimination policy. What followed was a temporary ban of the "Pure" course and a subsequent threats of litigation. The story became a national press fiasco, though The Student was one of the first to break the story.

 JK Rowling interview 

In early March 2008, The Student published an interview with JK Rowling, author of the best-selling Harry Potter series. Rowling told The Student journalist Adeel Amini that she had considered suicide during her mid-20s but that she had overcome depression through counselling. On 23 March, newspapers from around the world, including USA Today, the British newspaper The Times, and several major Indian newspapers published the excerpt from Amini's interview.

 Princess Anne controversies 
In October 2011, The Student ran the headline "A fucking disgrace" "A Fucking Disgrace"''' for its coverage of the appointment and inauguration of Princess Anne as Chancellor of the University of Edinburgh. The quote was from a student on-looker for the protests outside Old College. University administration banned the particular copy of The Student from distribution in academic buildings, citing offence caused to their staff members as the reason.

In October 2013, The Student released a story stating that two students were removed from campus buildings and detained by royal protection officers ahead of a visit from Princess Anne, with one of the students being subject to xenophobic abuse from university security guards. The story was picked up by national newspapers such as The Independent 

 EUSA censorship row 

In January and February 2013, "The Edinburgh University Students' Association" took out an interdict against The Student to stop them publishing a story rumoured to be related to Max Crema, an EUSA sabbatical officer.

On 26 February, ex-Features editor of the Student Cameron Taylor submitted two motions to EUSA, one a vote of no confidence against Max Crema and one a motion to censure James McAsh (President of EUSA), and after a Comment piece published in the Student explaining his actions, it was revealed that he was behind the anonymous Facebook page and blog 'Are you happy with EUSA?'. An Emergency Special General Meeting was called for 6.30pm on Wednesday 6 March in George Square Lecture Theatre, to debate the two motions. The Student published an interview where editors Alistair Grant and Nina Seale interviewed both James McAsh and Max Crema about the actions they were being held accountable for. On 1 March, student John Wallace submitted another motion to hold a vote of no confidence against James McAsh. Both motions fell well short of the two thirds majority required.

 Esme Allman - Robbie Travers controversy 

In September 2017, The Student released two interviews - one with former Edinburgh University Students' Association Black and Minority Ethnic (BME) Convenor Esme Allman and one with law student Robbie Travers whom Allman had filed a complaint against. The paper's independent coverage dispelled earlier national media reports that Travers had been investigated by Edinburgh University for "mocking ISIS". The SPA-award-winning interviews were subsequently picked up by newspapers such as The Guardian, later being commented on by acclaimed author JK Rowling on her Twitter account.

 Financial issues 
In early 2002, The Students continuous run came to an end when the newspaper faced "five-figure debts". The official explanation was that the post-11 September 2001 climate had caused a downturn in advertising, something being widely claimed by other newspapers at the time. The newspaper was relaunched at the start of the 2002-3 academic year and advertising sales, which had been traditionally managed internally, began to be handled by the advertising department of the Students' Association, though the paper's committee now includes a Head of Advertising. The paper recovered quickly, returning to weekly publication with a redesign soon after the start of the next academic year.

Notable former editors and staff members
 Gordon Brown (former Prime Minister)
 Robin Cook (former Foreign Secretary)
George Foulkes (Minister of State for Scotland)
 David Steel (former leader, Liberal Party)
 Will Lyons (Columnist, The Wall Street Journal)
 Noam Friedlander (Author of Celebrity Biography)
 Helen Pidd (Northern Editor, The Guardian)
 Bill Turnbull (journalist and newsreader for the BBC)
 A S Neill (Progressive Educator, founder of Summerhill School)
 Amy Liptrot (Author of The Outrun'')
 Tom Bradby (Former Political Editor, ITV News)
 Jonathan Liew (sports journalist)
 Fern Brady (comedian and writer)
 Francine Toon (novelist and poet)

Footnotes and references

See also 
 List of newspapers in Scotland

External links
 

Clubs and societies of the University of Edinburgh
Newspapers published in Scotland
Student newspapers published in the United Kingdom
Mass media in Edinburgh
Publications established in 1887
Weekly newspapers published in the United Kingdom